The 1941 Arkansas State Indians football team represented Arkansas State College—now known as Arkansas State University—as a member of the Arkansas Intercollegiate Conference (AIC) during the 1941 college football season. Led by third-year head coach Bill Adams, the Indians compiled an overall record of 0–7 with a mark of 0–1 in conference play.

Schedule

References

Arkansas State
Arkansas State Red Wolves football seasons
College football winless seasons
Arkansas State Indians football